Lucey is a surname.

Lucey may also refer to the following places in France:

 Lucey, Côte-d'Or, France
 Lucey, Meurthe-et-Moselle, France
 Lucey, Savoie, France

See also 
 Lucy (disambiguation)
 Luci (disambiguation)
 Lucie (disambiguation)